Jōdō is a Japanese martial art that uses the jō, a  wooden staff.

Jodo may also refer to:

Jōdo-shū, a Japanese branch of Pure Land Buddhism, distinct from the larger Jōdo Shinshū branch
Jodo, a pen name used by Alejandro Jodorowsky
Jodo Kast, a minor character from Star Wars who impersonated Boba Fett
Jodo-myeon, a township in Jindo County of South Jeolla Province, South Korea